Tripudia balteata is a moth in the family Noctuidae (the owlet moths). The species was first described by Smith in 1900. It is found in North America.

The MONA or Hodges number for Tripudia balteata is 9005.

References

Further reading

External links
 

Eustrotiinae
Articles created by Qbugbot
Moths described in 1900